Patuxent Ice Stream is a broad Antarctic ice stream between the Patuxent Range and Pecora Escarpment in the Pensacola Mountains, draining northwestward to the upper part of Foundation Ice Stream. Mapped by U.S. Geological Survey (USGS) from surveys and U.S. Navy (USN) air photos, 1956-66. Named by Advisory Committee on Antarctic Names (US-ACAN) for its proximity to the Patuxent Range.

See also

 List of glaciers in the Antarctic
 List of Antarctic ice streams

References

West Antarctica
Ice streams of Antarctica